Shyam Kumar (born M. Shyam Kumar) was an Indian cricketer. He was a right-handed batsman and right-arm medium-pace bowler who played for Kerala. He was born in  Tellicherry.

Kumar made a single first-class appearance for the side, during the 1985-86 Ranji Trophy season, against Andhra. From the lower order, he scored a single run in the first innings in which he batted, and a duck in the second.

Kumar took a single wicket from nine overs of bowling.

External links
Shyam Kumar at CricketArchive 

People from Thalassery
Kerala cricketers
Living people
Indian cricketers
Cricketers from Kerala
Year of birth missing (living people)